Kys, or Kanebion, also known as Palaiapolis, was a town of ancient Caria. 

Its site is located near Bellibol in Asiatic Turkey.

References

Populated places in ancient Caria
Former populated places in Turkey
Roman towns and cities in Turkey
History of Muğla Province